Tonight on Broadway is a weekly television show that ran from 1948 to 1950 on the CBS Television network. It premiered on April 6, 1948 and was the first program to be broadcast over the newly formed CBS network.

The show, which was developed by Martin A. Gosch, aired excerpts from Broadway shows live from the theaters in which they were playing, giving viewers a behind-the-scenes perspective. The show was hosted by John Mason Brown, who was the president of the New York Drama Critics' Circle.

The first show, on April 6, 1948, featured the original Broadway cast of the musical Lend an Ear. The last episode was High Button Shoes, on April 20, 1948.

American Tobacco Company was the sponsor.

See also
1948-49 United States network television schedule
1949-50 United States network television schedule

References

External links

CBS original programming
1948 American television series debuts
1950 American television series endings
American television talk shows
Black-and-white American television shows